New Brighton is the name of several places, sports teams etc.:

Australia

 New Brighton, New South Wales, a town near Ocean Shores

Canada

 New Brighton, Calgary, Alberta, a neighborhood
 New Brighton (Gambier Island), a settlement in British Columbia

New Zealand

 New Brighton, New Zealand, a suburb of Christchurch

South Africa
 New Brighton, Johannesburg, a suburb
 New Brighton, Eastern Cape, a township and suburb of Port Elizabeth

United Kingdom
 New Brighton, Bradford, a location in West Yorkshire
 New Brighton, Hampshire, a location
 New Brighton, Leeds, West Yorkshire
 New Brighton, Merseyside, a seaside resort in Wallasey, England
New Brighton A.F.C., the current football (soccer) club
New Brighton Tower F.C., a former Football (soccer) club
New Brighton F.C. (rugby union), a rugby union club
 New Brighton, Flintshire, a village in the county of Flintshire, Wales
 New Brighton, Wrexham, a hamlet in Wrexham County Borough, Wales

United States

 New Brighton, Minnesota, a city
 New Brighton, Pennsylvania, a borough
 New Brighton State Beach in California
 New Brighton, Staten Island, a neighborhood in New York City
New Brighton (Staten Island Railway station), a closed railway station

See also 
 Brighton (disambiguation)